Jonathan Pratt is an American diplomat who has served as the United States Ambassador to Djibouti since 2021.

Early life and education 

Pratt earned a Bachelor of Arts from Wesleyan University in Middletown, Connecticut and an Master of Arts from the University of California, San Diego.

Career 

Pratt is a career member of the Senior Foreign Service, class of Counselor. He has held assignments as the Deputy Chief of Mission of the United States Embassy in Islamabad, Pakistan, and as the Office Director for Pakistan Affairs in the State Department.  He served earlier as the Political Counselor at the United States Embassy in Islamabad, as the Deputy Chief of Mission of the United States Embassy in Brazzaville, Republic of the Congo, and as the Political and Economic Section Chief at the United States Embassy in Khartoum, Sudan. Other assignments also include service at the United States Embassies in Angola, Jordan and the Democratic Republic of Congo.

On May 1, 2020, President Donald Trump announced his intent to nominate Pratt to be the next United States Ambassador to Djibouti. On May 19, 2021, his nomination was sent to the United States Senate. On August 5, 2021, a hearing was held on his nomination before the Senate Committee on Foreign Relations. On December 15, 2020, his nomination was confirmed in the Senate by voice vote. On February 22, 2021, Pratt presented his credentials to President Ismaïl Omar Guelleh.

Personal life 

Pratt speaks Chinese, Arabic, French, Spanish and Portuguese.

See also
List of ambassadors of the United States
Embassy of the United States, Djibouti City

References

Living people
Year of birth missing (living people)
Place of birth missing (living people)
21st-century American diplomats
United States Department of State officials
United States Foreign Service personnel
University of California, San Diego alumni
Wesleyan University alumni